USS Long Beach (AK-9) was a cargo steamship that was built in England in 1892 as Yarrowdale, passed through a succession of British, Greek and German owners, and was seized by the United States in 1917. She served in the US Navy until 1921, then in the US Merchant Marine, and was scrapped in 1924. She was called Nicolaos Castriotis in Greek ownership, Hohenfelde in German ownership, and Golden Gate from 1923.

Yarrowdale
William Pickersgill & Sons built the ship at Southwick, Sunderland, County Durham, as yard number 101. She was launched in 5 October 1892 and completed that November.

George Clark Ltd built her three-cylinder triple expansion engine.

The Mackill Steamship Company owned Yarrowdale, and Robert Mackill & Company managed her. She was registered in Glasgow. Her UK official number was 99857 and her code letters were MVBN.

Nicolaos Castriotis and Hohenfelde
In 1902 CN Castriotti acquired Yarrowdale, renamed her Nicolaos Castriotis and registered her in Piraeus.

In 1905 D Fuhrmann, Nissle und Günther Nachfolger acquired Nicolaos Castriotis, renamed her Hohenfelde, and registered her in Hamburg. Her code letters were RNMF. By August 1914 she had taken refuge from the First World War in Savannah, Georgia.

Long Beach
On 6 April 1917 the United States declared war on the Central Powers. The United States Shipping Board seized the Central Powers' merchant ships in US ports. The USSB seized Hohenfelde in Savannah and transferred her to the US Navy the same day.

On 20 December 1917 the ship was commissioned at Charleston Navy Yard as USS Long Beach (ID-2136), commanded by Lt Cdr Frederick Nelson, USNRF. On 26 December she left Jacksonville carrying a cargo of lumber to Philadelphia, where she arrived on 9 January 1918. On 4 February she left Norfolk, Virginia for Dublin, Ireland, where she arrived on 3 March. There she joined the United States Army Cross Channel Service, carrying coal from the United Kingdom to France. During 1918 Lt Cdr Einar Clark, USNRF, succeeded Lt Cdr Nelson as her commander.

On 23 April 1919 Long Beach left Dublin carrying a cargo of aviation materiél to Norfolk, VA, where she arrived on 13 May. Long Beach was overhauled at Philadelphia, and then joined the Naval Overseas Transportation Service. She took coal to Portsmouth, NH, Boston and Key West, and in 1920 made two voyages to the West Indies to deliver supplies to US Marine Corps detachments. On 17 July 1920 she was redesignated AK-9. On 19 December 1920 she left Norfolk, VA carrying coal to Melville, RI. She then entered Boston Navy Yard, where she was decommissioned in 26 April 1921.

By 1921 Long Beach was equipped for wireless telegraphy. On 4 May 1922 Mr BL Stafford of New York bought her for $20,000. Her owner was recorded as the Long Beach Steam Ship Corporation, which may have been a one-ship company created especially to own her.

Golden Gate
In July 1923 Callaghan Atkinson & Co of New York bought the ship and renamed her Golden Gate. In 1924 she was registered in Wilmington, Delaware and her registered owner was the Golden Gate Navigation Company, Inc, which may have been another one-ship company. Her US official number was 22376 and her code letters were MDRQ. She was scrapped in Genoa, Italy in October 1924.

References

Bibliography

1892 ships
Cargo ships of the United States Navy
Merchant ships of the United Kingdom
Merchant ships of the United States
Ships built on the River Wear
Steamships of the German Empire
Steamships of Greece
Steamships of the United Kingdom
Steamships of the United States
World War I cargo ships of the United States
World War I merchant ships of Germany